Akpabuyo is a Local Government Area of Cross River State, Nigeria. Its headquarters are in the town of Ikot Nakanda.
 
It has an area of 1,241 km and a population of 271,395 at the 2006 census.

The postal code of the area is 541.

Akpabuyo was established as a separate local government area in 1991.

Elizabeth Edem Ironbar represented the town on Cross River State House of Assembly from 2015 to 2021.

References

Local Government Areas in Cross River State
Populated coastal places in Nigeria
1991 establishments in Nigeria